Nova Gorica Sports Park is a multi-purpose sports venue in Nova Gorica, Slovenia. It is currently used mostly for football matches and is the home ground of ND Gorica. The stadium was built in 1964 and has a capacity of 3,100 seats.

International matches

See also
List of football stadiums in Slovenia

References

External links
Stadioni.org profile

Football venues in Slovenia
Multi-purpose stadiums in Slovenia
Buildings and structures in Nova Gorica
Sports venues completed in 1964
Sports venues in the Slovene Littoral
20th-century architecture in Slovenia